Thief is the third studio album by Destroyer, released in 2000. It was the first recorded with a full band on every track.

Critical reception
Exclaim! wrote that Bejar's "biting socio-political commentary sets him apart from soft pop merchants like Belle and Sebastian, while creating music far superior in its sheer beauty." Neil Strauss, in The New York Times, called the album "phenomenal." The Globe and Mail thought that "the full-band settings are downright grand, fashionably tinged with some Beach Boys and Bowie; Bejar's singing is less naggingly affected, more commanding."

Track listing

Personnel 
Dan Bejar
John Collins
Scott Morgan
Stephen Wood
Jason Zumpano

References

2000 albums
Destroyer (band) albums
Albums produced by John Collins (Canadian musician)